Consalvo Caputo (12 March 1598 – 19 November 1645) was a Roman Catholic prelate who served as Bishop of Catanzaro (1633–1645)
and Bishop of San Marco (1630–1633

Biography
Consalvo Caputo was born in Naples, Italy on 12 March 1598.
On 18 February 1630, he was appointed during the papacy of Pope Urban VIII as Bishop of San Marco.
On 24 February 1630, he was consecrated bishop by Luigi Caetani, Cardinal-Priest of Santa Pudenziana, with Giulio Antonio Santoro, Archbishop of Cosenza, Antonio Ricciulli, Bishop Emeritus of Belcastro, serving as co-consecrators.
On 8 August 1633, he was appointed during the papacy of Pope Urban VIII as Bishop of Catanzaro.
He served as Bishop of Catanzaro until his death on 19 November 1645.

References

External links and additional sources

17th-century Italian Roman Catholic bishops
Bishops appointed by Pope Urban VIII
1598 births
1645 deaths